Max Bendix (1866–1945) was an American composer, conductor, and violinist; he worked for many years with Theodore Thomas, and he was the first concertmaster of the Chicago Symphony Orchestra from 1891 until 1896. He also served for a time as concertmaster of the Metropolitan Opera orchestra.  He wrote a number of works for orchestra and some incidental music as well as songs.

Bendix was born in Detroit, Michigan, the son of German-born parents, Bertha (Tobias) and William Bendix. He is sometimes listed as the father of actor William Bendix, but this is inaccurate. He was William's uncle.

Further reading

References

1866 births
1945 deaths
American male composers
American composers
Musicians from Detroit